The following is a list of fictional criminal and terrorist organizations that have been published by DC Comics and their imprints.

0-9

100

Originally based in Metropolis, the 100 kept a firm grip on the city's criminal underworld for years, indulging in crimes such as drug trafficking and racketeering. Their first appearance was in Superman's Girlfriend Lois Lane #105. A recent retcon in Superman #665 (September 2007) shows that during Superman's early years in Metropolis, the 100 was a smaller organization called the 10 with ties to Intergang.

1,000

The former Director of the 1,000 was a US senator named Henry Ballard who shepherded the organization's new direction and goals. Under Director Ballard, the 100 changed its name to the 1,000, attempting to expand their reach to even the Oval Office with Director Ballard as the presidential candidate. The 1,000 first appear in Booster Gold #2 (March 1986).

2000 Committee
A vast criminal organization that planned to take over the world by the year 2000. The 2000 Committee gave a criminal named the Breathtaker the task of killing Firestorm (Ron Raymond), and he passed the task on to a villainess named the Mindboggler. Firestorm defeated both the Breathtaker and the Mindboggler and handed them over to the authorities. The Mindboggler later led Firestorm to the headquarters of the committee. The committee was founded by corrupt industrialist Henry Hewitt, a.k.a. Tokamak, and first appeared in Fury of Firestorm #15. Other operatives of the committee were the Enforcers (Leroy Merkyn and Mica) and Multiplex.

A

Academy of Crime
The Academy of Crime is a low rent "school for criminals" based in Hollywood, California. First appearing in Detective Comics #515 (June 1982), it is an institute run by a thug called Headmaster who educates his students in the art of various crimes. Mirage is a known graduate of the Academy of Crime. It was shut down by Batman when some of its students ended up in Gotham City.

The Agenda
The Agenda is an opposing organization in genetics to Project Cadmus that absorbed Darkseid's Evil Factory and is responsible for creating Match. The group appears to have ended with the death of their leader, Lex Luthor's ex-wife Contessa Erica Alexandra del Portenza. Their first appearance was in Superboy (vol. 4) #36 (February 1997).

Altered Strain
Altered Strain was formed after the Invasion, all its known members carriers of the metagene who manifest no powers. They saw themselves as natural leaders, and wanted the U.S. government to find a way to turn on everyone's metagene. They first appear in Wonder Woman Annual #3.

Anti-Justice League
The Anti-Justice League is a short-lived villain group assembled by Queen Bee. It consists of Brainiac, Chronos, Clayface II, Gorilla Grodd, Harpy, Merlyn, Ocean Master, and Sinestro.

Aryan Brigade

The Aryan Brigade is a group associated with the Aryan Nation that serve as their purifiers.

The first incarnation of the group consists of Backlash, Blind Faith, Golden Eagle, Heatmonger, and Iron Cross.

The second incarnation of the group consists of Backlash, Bonehead, Luftwaffe, and Rebel.

ASP
The Neo-Nazi terrorist organization known as the ASP (short for American Supremacist Party) first appeared in Checkmate #1. The group was responsible for a series of fatal bombings and attempted to release a weaponized biological agent.

Assassination Bureau
The Assassination Bureau is an organization of metahuman assassins led by the mysterious Breathtaker, the Bureau was hired by the 2000 Committee to kill Firestorm. Known operatives are Stratos (aerokinetic), the Mindboggler (telepathy), and Incognito (shape shifter). First appears in Fury of Firestorm #29 (November 1984).

B

The Battalion of Doom
The Battalion of Doom kidnapped a variety of influential journalists and businessmen and demanded "the complete surrender of all political, financial, and police power in Gotham". If the demands were not met, the Battalion was prepared to detonate a nuclear device within the city. After infiltrating the terrorists as a West Coast enforcer, Superman joined Batman in rescuing the hostages and locating the bomb. The members of the Battalion wore military browns with magenta hoods over their heads. First and only appearance is in The Brave and the Bold #150.

The Black Dragon Society

The Black Dragon Society is based on a real World War II organization of the same name; this society was not nearly as sinister as its comic book counterparts. Three different comics companies used the Black Dragon Society as villains in the 1940s: National Comics (DC Comics), Fawcett Comics, and Quality Comics. DC Comics came to own the other two companies, so all the different incarnations of the Black Dragon Society now belong to them. All-Star Comics #12 had "The Black Dragon Menace" in which a Japanese spy ring called the Black Dragon Society of Japan steals eight American inventions and kidnaps their inventors.

The modern versions of the Black Dragon Society show up in the pages of Power Company #1. This version appears to be made up of fanatical East Asian eco-terrorists.

Black Glove
The Black Glove organization is a group that was active following the deaths of Thomas Wayne and Martha Wayne. It is led by Simon Hurt and consists of various rich men and women of villainous natures.

Black Glove in other media
The Black Glove appears in the Batwoman episode "Antifreeze". While their history in the comics is intact, they are in collaboration with Jada Jett and her company Jet Industries in perfecting the freeze formula used by Mr. Freeze where it's operative Virgil Getty (portrayed by Josh Blacker) tested it on anyone that tried to expose them. The episode "We're All Mad Here" reveals that other known members of Black Glove are Barbara Kean, Burton Crowne, Jeremiah Arkham, and Mario Falcone and their founder was Maria Elliot, the mother of Tommy Elliot. Marquis Jett kidnaps them and Jada where he took them to a mausoleum. He uses a special gas mask to subject Barbara to the same chemicals used on James Gordon Jr. and kills Crown, Arkham, and Falcone. Before he can do away with Jada, Batwoman fights him off while rescuing Jada and seeing that Barbara gets medical attention.

Black Hole
Black Hole is a terrorist organization that has plans to harness the powers of the Speed Force so that they can use it for their own nefarious purposes. While Gorilla Grodd was a former leader, other known members include Dr. Holt, Dr. Huskk, Joseph Carver, Multiplex, and Raijin with a brainwashed Meena Dhawan operating as Negative Flash.

Black Hole in other media
Black Hole appears in The CW live-action television series, The Flash. This version was created and led by McCulloch Technologies' CEO Joseph Carver, who also employed light-themed assassins Ultraviolet, Doctor Light, and Sunshine. Introduced in season six, their operations are threatened by the Flash and his allies as well as Carver's presumed dead wife Eva McCulloch. By the end of the season, Eva destroys their information storehouse, sways the assassins to her side, and kills Carver. As of season seven, Rosalind Dillon and Sam Scudder had joined Black Hole until Eva kills the latter and sways the former to her side while hunting down the organization's remnants.

Black Ops
Black Ops was a criminal organization devoted to accumulating power with sophisticated headquarters in both Metropolis and Washington, D.C. Its leader was Hazard, otherwise known as philanthropist Manuel Cabral, head of Rainforest Technologies (and secretly affiliated with weapons manufacturer AmerTek). His costumed operatives included his female second-in-command Shellshock, Flatline, Hardsell, Hotspot, Mainline, Quake, Shellgame, and Split. The techno-pirates had frequent clashes with Steel, who ultimately prevented them from seizing control of the United States' nuclear arsenal. The team first appears in Steel #6.

Blockbuster's Gang
Blockbuster's Gang first appears in Nightwing vol. 2 #2. This gang was one of the most powerful mobs in Blüdhaven, made up of corrupt police officers and supervillains. The organization leader is Roland Desmond.

Current members: Thrilldevil, Giz, Mouse and Mateo Flores.

Former members: Brutale, the Electrocutioner III, Torque, Lady Vic, the Shrike IV, the Stallion, the Tarantula II, the Trigger Twins and Cicso Blane.

Brotherhood of Dada

The Brotherhood of Dada is absurdist group created by Mr. Nobody when he was denied membership in the Brotherhood of Evil.

Brotherhood of Evil

The Brotherhood of Evil is an organization that has antagonized the Doom Patrol and the Teen Titans.

C

C.A.W. I
C.A.W. (short for "Criminal Alliance of the World") specialized in archaeological forensics used for the retrieval of lost ancient technology. This brought them into conflict with Katar Hol and Shayera Hol, when the attempted to steal an artifact from the Midway City Museum. The paired artifacts they were attempting to steal were analyzed and led to the development of the Justice League of America's teleportation system which first appears in Justice League of America #78. The organization is ruled by an international triad of masked crime bosses; C.A.W. agents wear matching red and black costumes with a golden, razor-edged C.A.W. emblem on their chests that doubled as a weapon.

C.A.W. II
A second organization calling itself C.A.W. (Crusading American Warriors) was encountered by Hawkgirl (Kendra Saunders) in JSA: All-Stars #2.

Cell Six
Cell Six was "the most notorious terrorist organization in Latin America", one responsible for the abduction of Wayne Enterprises' Lucius Fox while he was in the country of Hasaragua. 
They demanded $3 million in ransom, and a letter of apology from Wayne Enterprises for despoiling Hasaragua's environment and the exploitation of its people.

The kidnapping was eventually exposed as a collaboration between Hasaragua's finance minister and Cell Six. In Gotham City, Cell Six also staged a kidnapping attempt against the wife of a Hasaraguan ambassador. Cell Six troops could be visually distinguished by the Roman numeral "VI" (for 6) tattooed on their foreheads.

Church of Blood
The Church of Blood is a fictional organization appearing in American comic books published by DC Comics.

The Church of Blood is an organization that is often led by anyone with the name of Brother Blood where two of them were born from the women that have gone by the name of Mother Mayhem.

Church of Blood in other media
The Church of Blood appears in Arrow.

The Church of Blood appears in season four of Titans led by Mother Mayhem to recruit her son Sebastian to lead.

Children of Light
The Children of Light was a middle-eastern costumed terrorist group originally led by Kahman Abhood. Following Abhood's arrest, the group seized control of a S.T.A.R. Labs/Waynetech satellite, equipped it with a laser cannon, and threatened to destroy cities at will if their demands were not met. Batman and Supergirl defeated the group and discovered that they'd allied themselves with Doctor Light. They first appeared in The Brave and the Bold #147.

Colossus
Colossus was a mysterious organization that sought the secret of Alec Holland's bio-restorative formula to create an army of swamp men similar to the Swamp Thing. The organization was led by a mysterious council, each member of which wore a uniquely colored costume (Councilman Red, Councilman Blue). Colossus had the ability to mutate humans into monstrous agents known as "Elementals". Only one Elemental by the name of Thrudvang the Earth Master  was ever actually depicted; he was a skid row bum who transformed into a hulking yellow monster with the "ability to disrupt the earth". Colossus' chief enforcer was Sabre, a red and blue costumed figure with a long thin blade replacing his right hand. They first appeared in Swamp Thing #23.

The Council
The first Council was an international secret society, which was responsible for the cloning of Paul Kirk (the Manhunter) and was eventually brought down by him and his allies Asano Nitobe, Christine St. Clair, and Kolu Mbeya.
 
Under the leadership of Anatol Mykros they rebuilt themselves up again, to the point where their machinations brought them to the attention of various members of the Justice Society of America. Nemesis (Soseh Mykros), the daughter of Council leader Anatol Mykros, rebeled against them, enlisting the help of the JSA. It was eventually destroyed when Black Adam killed Anatol Mykros in order to have Nemesis join his pro-active super-team. The Council first appeared in Detective Comics #437 (February 1974).

The Council in other media
The first Council appears in Beware the Batman, with Anatol Mykros voiced by Bruce Thomas. As in the comics, they capture Paul Kirk and put him in suspended animation, using his DNA to create an army of robot Manhunter clones to take over the world. After Kirk's escape, Mykros and the clones kidnap his daughter Ava Kirk in Gotham City. They are eventually stopped by Kirk, Batman, Katana, and a disguised Alfred Pennyworth. The council is still out there with Kirk swearing to take them all down.

Council of Spiders
The Council of Spiders is a cadre of metahuman killers-for-hire led by the mutant super-villainess known only as the Wanderer. When they debuted in Red Robin, they were hunting members of Ra's al Ghul's League of Assassins.

Court of Owls

The Court of Owls is a secret society of high class Gothamites who have held a grip on Gotham City's political influence since colonial times, known for kidnapping children from the circus and brainwashing them into assassins which they call 'Talons' they are characterized by there distinct white masks that look similar to an owl.

Crime Syndicate of America

The Crime Syndicate of America is an evil version of the Justice League that comes from Earth-Three.

Cult of the Unwritten Book
First appearing in Doom Patrol #31, the Cult of the Unwritten Book is a religious order that is dedicated to the total annihilation of the entire universe by summoning an entity called the Decreator.

Cult of the Unwritten Book in other media
The Cult of the Unwritten Book appears in the TV series Doom Patrol.

CYCLOPS
The group of international jewel thieves known as CYCLOPS, first appeared in The Brave and the Bold #64. Known operatives are Marcia Monroe, the chronologically second Queen Bee.

D

D.M.T.
The D.M.T. were an international weapons coalition who came into possession of an extraterrestrial craft and its pilot following the events of the Invasion. Their field agents wore gold armor that was equipped with weapons and flight packs. The D.M.T. first appeared in Superman #48.

Dark Nemesis

Dark Nemesis is a group of high-powered people that will work for anyone who can pay them. It consists of Axis, Blizzard, Carom, Scorcher I, Scorcher II, and Vault.

DEMON
DEMON is a terrorist organization, dedicated to "Destruction, Extortion, Murder, Overthrow of Nations", based in the Near Eastern country of Sinsubhani. It was broken up by Kal-El in Superman #191 (November 1966).

Dreadfuls
The Dreadfuls are the evil counterparts of the Terrifics. Led by Java's Doctor Dread alias, they consist of characters that he gathered from across the Multiverse like Metalmorpho (a robot counterpart of Metamorpho), Phantom Boy (a male counterpart of Phantom Girl), and Plasma-Man (a vampire version of Plastic Man).

E

Eden Corps
Outwardly an above-board West Coast organization, the Eden Corps soon established itself as a radical terrorist cell dedicated to taking on "corporate America and its ravagers". Led by Hyrax (Veronica Dale), the Eden Corps committed terrorist-styled crimes, like bombing dams on its way to a bigger goal, unleashing a Russian-created weaponized germ that ate plastic. Before the Eden Corps could unleash the germ on Metropolis, the Green Arrow intervened. Hyrax died in the battle and the Green Arrow followed soon after. They first appeared in Green Arrow (vol. 2) #97.

Eden Corps in other media
Eden Corps appears on The Flash season 4 episode "Enter Flashtime". Veronica Dale (portrayed by Bernadette Saquibal) and her terrorist organization the Eden Corps set off a nuclear bomb that the Flash and his crew must figure out how to stop. Team Flash is able to stop the bomb and Dale is arrested.

Arrows season 7 flash-forwards that take place in 2040 where a company called Galaxy One operates as an Eden Corps front. It is led by Keven Dale (portrayed by Raj Paul) who acts as the CEO of Galaxy One. The company controls the Glades with an anti-vigilante security program called Archer and is looking to take over Star City as well.

Empire of Death
The Empire of Death was a terrorist group formed by a former Nazi SS colonel named Von Gross. Its agents wore skull masks, possessed a fleet of aircraft, and operated from a giant solar-powered flying skull. With "trained agents in every corner of the globe", the Empire of Death engaged in espionage and contract assassination with an eye towards world domination. Von Gross was eventually slain by Blackhawk but the Empire of Death remained a going concern through its operatives. The commander of the Empire of Death's undersea forces was Killer Shark, who retooled the War Wheel into an amphibious weapon of destruction. They first appeared in Blackhawk #249.

Eurocrime
Eurocrime is a European metahuman criminal organization that fought the Elongated Man and Justice League Europe. First appears in Elongated Man #1 (January 1992).

Extremists
The Extremists are a group of supervillains that came from the other-dimensional world of Angor and are modeled after characters from Marvel Comics.

The first incarnation consists of Lord Havok (who is modeled after Doctor Doom), Dreamslayer (who is modeled after Dormammu), Gorgon (who was modeled after Doctor Octopus), Tracer (who was modeled after Sabretooth), Doctor Diehard (who was modeled after Magneto), Carny (who is modeled after Arcade), and Barracuda (who is modeled after Tiger Shark).

Dreamslayer was later contracted by Overmaster to form a variation of the Extremists called the New Extremists which consist of Brute, Cloudburst, Death Angel, Gunshot, and Meanstreak.

Extremists in other media
The original Extremists (minus Doctor Diehard) appeared in the Justice League Unlimited episode "Shadow of the Hawk". They were not shown as being terribly effective against the Justice League during their fight with them. During their attack on Earth, the Extremists were defeated by the Justice League.

F

False Face Society
The False Face Society (also known as the False Facers and the Sionis Crime Family) is a gang of masked criminals led by Black Mask. Its known members include Black Spider II, Circe, Dwarf, Edgar Dempsey, Mad Bull, Metalhead. Each of its members are known for wearing different masks.

In 2011, "The New 52" rebooted the DC universe. In this continuity, the False Face Society was first formed by Roman Sionis's father Richard Sionis.

False Face Society in other media
 The False Face Society appears in the Batman: The Brave and the Bold episode "Plague of the Prototypes!", with Black Mask and Taboo as prominent members.
 The False Face Society appear in the second season of Batwoman. This version of the group wear a variety of different masks and distribute a drug called "Snakebite". Additionally, three of their members work as double agents in the Gotham City Police Department.

Futuresmiths
The Futuresmiths are a mysterious group of criminal scientists and high tech arms dealers who have an underground operation in Metropolis. Known operatives are Amok and Cir-El. They first appear in Superman: The 10-Cent Adventure #1 (March 2003). It was later revealed to have been a front for Brainiac.

H

H.I.V.E.

H.I.V.E. stands for the Hierarchy of International Vengeance and Extermination. During the first incarnation of the H.I.V.E., the H.I.V.E. Master gathered seven other unnamed criminal scientists to take over the world and eliminate their enemies in the form of Superman and the Teen Titans. The H.I.V.E. Master is later killed and replaced by the H.I.V.E. Mistress and they enlist Deathstroke the Terminator to help them out.

The second Incarnation of the H.I.V.E. was established by Adeline Kane, Deathstroke's ex-wife. They were tracked down by Tartarus, an Anti-Titans led by Vandal Savage and made up of Gorilla Grodd, Lady Vic, the Red Panzer, the Siren, and Cheshire.

Hangmen
The Hangmen is a group of high-powered assassins. It consists of Breathtaker, Killshot, Provoke, Stranglehold, and Shock Trauma.

Helix
Helix is a supervillain group. They are six who were experimented on by Dr. Benjamin Love when they were still in the womb of their respective mothers. These kids consisted of Mister Bones, Penny Dreadful, Kritter, Tao Jones, Baby Boom, and Arak Wind-Walker. Carcharo, the cousin of Yolanda Montez, was briefly associated with Helix at one point. This group has clashed with Infinity, Inc. on occasion.

Helix in other media
A variation of Helix appears in Stargirl. This version is the organization is known as the Helix Institute of Youth Rehabilitation, which is run by Mister Bones and Nurse Louise Love.

Hybrid
The Hybrid is a supervillain group that were formed by Mento from people who suffered from accidents. Upon gathering these people following their respective accidents, Mento experimented on them with the artificial compound Promethium, turning many of them into superhuman freaks. The Hybrid consists of Behemoth, Gorgon, Harpi, Prometheus, Pteradon, Scirocco, and Touch-N-Go. Following a fight with the Teen Titans, each of the members were cured of their insanity by Raven.

I

Injustice Gang
The Injustice Gang is an antagonist group that are antagonists of the Justice League.

The first incarnation was led by Libra were Construct and Abra Kadabra were known leaders. It also consists of Chronos, Mirror Master, Poison Ivy, Scarecrow, Shadow Thief, and Tattooed Man.

The second incarnation was led by Lex Luthor in one of his plots to destroy the Justice League. Its known members are Circe, Doctor Light, General, Jemm, Joker, Mirror Master, Ocean Master, Prometheus, and Queen Bee.

Injustice Gang in other media
Two incarnations of the Injustice Gang appear in Justice League. The first incarnation appears in the two-part episode "Injustice For All", formed and led by Lex Luthor and consisting of the Cheetah, Copperhead, the Joker, Shade, Solomon Grundy, Star Sapphire, and Ultra-Humanite to combat the Justice League. In the two-part episode "Fury", Aresia reassembles the Injustice Gang with Copperhead, Shade, Solomon Grundy, Star Sapphire, and a new character named Tsukuri.

Injustice League
The Injustice League are the antagonists of the Justice League. The Injustice League has been through three incarnations.

The first incarnation was led by Agamemno and consisted of Lex Luthor, Black Manta, Catwoman, Chronos, Doctor Light, Felix Faust, Mister Element, Penguin, Sinestro, and Zoom.

The second incarnation was the Injustice League International that consists of Cluemaster, Major Disaster, Clock King, Big Sir, Multi-Man, and the Mighty Bruce. Maxwell Lord turned this group into the Justice League Antarctica while adding G'nort and Scarlet Skier to the group.

The third incarnation was the Injustice League International and was formed by Lex Luthor, Cheetah, and Joker. Its core membership consists of Cheshire, Deathstroke, Doctor Light, Fatality, Giganta, Gorilla Grodd, Killer Frost, Parasite, Poison Ivy, Shadow Thief, and Shaggy Man. Other known members are Black Manta, Clayface, Doctor Sivana, Double Dare, Effigy, Felix Faust, Girder, Hammer and Sickle, a Hyena, Iron Cross of the Aryan Brigade, Jewelee, Jinx, Key, Killer Croc, Lady Vic, Major Force, Magenta, Mammoth, Manticore, Metallo, Mister Terrible, Mirror Master, Monsieur Mallah, Mr. Freeze, Nocturna, Phobia, Prankster, Psimon, Queen Bee, Rag Doll, Riddler, Rock, Scarecrow, Shimmer, Shrapnel, Silver Monkey, Skorpio, Sonar, T.O. Morrow, Tar Pit, Toyman, Tremor of the Superior Five, Two-Face, and Warp.

In 2011, "The New 52" rebooted the DC universe. During the "Forever Evil" storyline, Lex Luthor forms this version of the Injustice League to combat the Crime Syndicate of America. It consists of Bizarro, Black Adam, Black Manta, Captain Cold, Catwoman, Deathstroke, and Sinestro.

Injustice League in other media
 The Injustice League appear in the Smallville episode "Injustice", consisting of Livewire, Neutron, Plastique, Parasite, and Eva Greer, a LuthorCorp psychic. They initially search for Doomsday until Tess Mercer assumes control of LuthorCorp and begins recruiting metahumans to form a team of heroes to defend Earth. After Neutron is killed by Doomsday, Mercer kills Livewire using an explosive chip implanted in the latter's skull. When Clark Kent discovers Greer's body and tells Parasite and Plastique, they disable the chips and attempt to form their own group of criminals, only to be defeated by Kent and the Green Arrow.
 The Injustice League appears in the Young Justice episode "Revelation", consisting of Count Vertigo, Poison Ivy, Black Adam, Wotan, Atomic Skull, Ultra-Humanite, and the Joker. This version of the group was created to serve as scapegoats for the Light and distract the Justice League and the Team from their plans.
 The Injustice League appears in Harley Quinn, consisting of Bane, the Riddler, the Penguin, Mr. Freeze, and Two-Face. This version of the group came together to take control of Gotham City after the Joker destroyed it and divide what was left between them. After Harley Quinn interferes with their plans, they attempt to negotiate peace with her, but she disagrees with them, so they have her frozen and put on display in Penguin's Iceberg Lounge. After she eventually gets free and murders the Penguin, Harley and her crew vow to defeat the Injustice League. In the episode "Riddler U", they capture the Riddler after learning his territory has power and clean water, and use him to power their mall lair. In "Thawing Hearts", Mr. Freeze sacrifices himself to cure his wife, Nora Fries. In "There's No Place to Go But Down", Harley and Poison Ivy defeat Bane while Commissioner Gordon defeats and incarcerates Two-Face.

Injustice League Dark
The Injustice League Dark is a villain group that antagonizes the Justice League Dark. The team was founded by Circe after she aided the Justice League Dark in defeating Hecate and, unknowingly to them, allow Circe to inherit the goddess' powers. She first recruits the  Floronic Man after he is empowered by consuming the King of Petals, a champion of the Green. Circe later recruits Klarion the Witch Boy with his familiar Teekl, Papa Midnite, and Solomon Grundy.

Injustice Society

The Injustice Society are the main antagonists of the Justice Society. The original lineup consisted of Wizard, Brain Wave, Gambler, Per Degaton, Thinker, and Vandal Savage.

Since then, there have been different incarnations of the group.

Intergang

Intergang is a criminal cartel secretly organized by Darkseid who was using Intergang to help track down the Anti-Life Equation. Intergang first appeared in Superman's Pal Jimmy Olsen #133 (October 1970).

International Crime Combine
The International Crime Combine is a supraorganization made up of operatives from various other criminal organizations some based in the DC Comics universe, like CYCLOPS and O.G.R.E., and other fictional organizations such as THRUSH and SPECTRE. They opposed G.E.O.R.G.E., a covert agency of the United States, and the Blackhawks.

K

Kobra Cult

Kobra is an international terrorist and mad scientist whose namesake organization has crossed paths with the majority of Earth's costumed heroes during his attempts to usher in the Kali Yuga (an age of chaos). His real name is Jeffrey Franklin Burr, and he was born part of a set of twins, but was stolen at birth by the Cult of the Kobra God, since a prophecy claimed he would lead them to rule the world. Under their teaching, he became a dangerous warrior and a sadistic criminal mastermind. Kobra led the cult into using advanced technology to menace the world.

The Kobra Cult first appears in Kobra #1 (March 1976). Kobra created two separate teams of superpowered mercenaries called Strike Force Kobra.

L

League of Ancients
The League of Ancients is a group of people that were assembled to combat the Justice League. They consist of the Atlantean sorceress Gamemnae (who foresaw the Justice League as the "Seven-Headed Hydra" that would threaten Atlantis), Jarhanpour ruler Rama Khan, magic user Manitou Raven, a fallen alien known as the Anointed One, a Northern Eurasian man called the Whaler, a pre-Aztec man named Tezumak, and a weapon-woman named Sela.

League of Ancients in other media
Members of the League of Ancients appear in Supergirl. In this show, Gamemnae, Rama Khan, Tezumak, and Sela are aliens from Krypton's sister planet Jarhanpur who are familiar with the languages of the Coluans and members of Leviathan.

League of Assassins

The League of Assassins is a cult-like organization of trained killers formerly led by Ra's al Ghul, an enemy of Batman. The League of Assassins was founded by Ra's al Ghul (exactly when is unknown) to be "the fang that protects the head" (Batgirl #67, 2005). Members of the League demonstrated willingness to die at a word from Ra's. They have included some of the most dangerous assassins in the world, including Lady Shiva, David Cain, and master archer Merlyn.

Legion of Doom

The Legion of Doom is a group of supervillains that originated in Challenge of the Super Friends, an animated series from Hanna-Barbera based on DC Comics' Justice League. The Legion of Doom has since been incorporated into the main DC Universe, appearing in comics, as well as further animated and live-action adaptations.

Legion of Zoom
The Legion of Zoom is a team that is led by Professor Zoom/Reverse-Flash (Eobard Thawne) who brought together Captain Cold, the Golden Glider, Gorilla Grodd, Tar Pit, the Tornado Twins, the Trickster, and the Turtle. They start to attack the Flash on all fronts to the point where Thawne starts to take over the Flash's body enough that the Flash Family had to assemble to combat him. After Thawne in Barry's body tries to get Captain Cold, the Golden Glider, Gorilla Grodd, and the Turtle to dig up Nora Allen's body, the Trickster and the Tornado Twins try to stop him when the rest of the Flash family shows up, only to be returned to their own timelines. When Thawne is exorcised from Barry Allen, he rounds up every villain who hates the Flash family to expand his Legion of Zoom, including Abra Kadabra, Belladonna, Blacksmith, Bloodwork, Double Down, the Fiddler, the Folded Man, Girder, Papercut, Peek-a-Boo, Plunder, the Rag Doll, Razer, the Thinker, and the Top.

Legion of Zoom in other media
An unrelated Legion of Zoom appears in Batwheels, consisting of the Joker's Jokermobile Prank (voiced by Griffin Burns), Harley Quinn's ATV Jestah (voiced by Alexandra Novelle), the Riddler's helicopter Quizz (voiced by Josey Montana McCoy), the Penguin's boat Ducky (voiced by Ariyan Kassam), Mr. Freeze's snowcrawler Snowy (voiced by Xolo Maridueña), the Batcomputer's rival Badcomputer (voiced by SungWon Cho), and a crash test dummy-esque robot named Crash (voiced by Tom Kenny).

Les Mille Yeux
Les Mille Yeux, "The Thousand Eyes", was a major international crime cartel involved in drugs, arms smuggling, and political blackmail. The Phantom Lady fought and blinded their Washington, D.C. leader, Edwin Guerrehart. Their first appearance was in Action Comics Weekly #636. Les Mille Yeux later hired Colonel Computron to kidnap Starman.

Leviathan

Leviathan is an organization founded by Talia al Ghul upon leaving her father Ra's al Ghul's League of Assassins. Leviathan's liturgy is staunchly anti-capitalist, and seeks to dismantle society and impose itself as the leaders of a new way. The organization has served as a threat to Batman Incorporated.

Locus
Locus is an international group of criminal scientists which conspired with the Appellaxian aliens to take over the world. Locus placed members of the Doom Patrol, Justice Society of America, and Justice League into special internment camps and stole their limbs in order to create perfect bodies for themselves. They first appeared in JLA: Year One #1 (January 1998).

M

MAZE
MAZE was an international espionage agency that stole information from around the world to sell to the highest bidder. They also undertook assignments to discredit political dissidents and assassinate world leaders. MAZE had access to a number of super-weapons and was constantly seeking new items for its arsenal. They first appeared in Superman #268. MAZE operatives frequently fought Batgirl and Robin in the pages of Batman Family in the 1970s.

Many Arms of Death
The Many Arms of Death is a terrorist group from Coryana that have fought Batwoman. Each of its members are named after a weapon (e.g. Knife, Needle, Rifle) due to the play on the "arms" portion of the name. The Many Arms of Death used a legitimate company called the Kali Corporation as a front. Scarecrow once worked with the Many Arms of Death under the alias of Needle. Alice was brainwashed by the Many Arms of Death to serve them under the alias of the Mother of War, after being taken from the sanatorium where she was being treated. Batman asks Batwoman to help break the Many Arms of Death. In doing so, Batwoman discovers that Tahani, a former lover of Safiyah Sohail and one of Kate's rivals for her affections years earlier, is one of the group's assassins, codenamed Knife.

Many Arms of Death in other media
The Many Arms of Death appear in season two of Batwoman. They consist of Pike, Rapier, Dire-Flail, and an assortment of unnamed members. The Many Arms of Death are depicted as an assassin group from Coryana that is loyal to Safiyah Sohail and do her bidding.

Masters of Disaster

The Masters of Disaster are a group of superpowered mercenaries that have powers derived from the elements.

Men from N.O.W.H.E.R.E.
First appearing in Doom Patrol (vol. 2) #35, the Men from N.O.W.H.E.R.E. is an organization that is dedicated to the extermination of eccentricity and difference after their soul husks have been harvested by the Agency and the Telephone Avatar during World War II. They once captured Flex Mentallo and targeted Danny the Street.

Men from N.O.W.H.E.R.E. in other media
In the TV series Doom Patrol, the Bureau of Normalcy is based on the Men from N.O.W.H.E.R.E.

Menagerie
During the "Forever Evil" storyline, Cheetah started a group called the Menagerie which consists of animal-like characters like Elephant Man, Hellhound, Lion-Mane, Mäuschen, Primeape, and Zebra-Man. Steve Trevor and Killer Frost fought them in the park when working to get the Lasso of Truth from Cheetah. While Steve Trevor defeated Cheetah and claimed the Lasso of Truth, Killer Frost froze the Menagerie and escaped.

Monster Society of Evil

The Monster Society of Evil is an organization formed by Mister Mind to carry out his evil plots.

N

Network I
The original Network members were a band of small-time villains whose metagenes were triggered by the Monitor shortly before the Crisis on Infinite Earths. The six criminals drew on broadcast power beamed down from a special satellite owned by the rock video channel RTV. The Network members were Blue Matt (invisibility), Cathode (electrokinetic), Erase (acid touch), Fast Forward (enhances kinetic potential), UHF (manipulates audible and inaudible soundwaves), and Volume (can increase mass and density). The first Network was defeated by Superman and Batman. The Network I first appeared in World's Finest Comics #311 (January 1985).

Network II
The second Network is a black market for supervillains based in Keystone City. This Network has been run by a villainess named Blacksmith. Its services are frequently used by Kobra. The Network's base is protected by the Rogues, and the Colonel Computron units.

Network III
The third Network is a widespread organization of criminals who recently appeared in Gotham City. Businesswoman Celia Kazantkakis (Athena), used the Network to get her revenge against the Gotham Rossetti mob. After a clash with Batman and his allies the Network was crippled, but Kazantkakis escaped. Known Network operatives are: the Tracker, the Technician, Doctor Excess, Bugg, the Suicide King, Mister Fun, and Freeway.

New Order
The New Order was a group of metahumans named Cain, Ammo, Corona, and Scud who commandeered a nuclear facility and demanded "one billion dollars and all mutant wild life freed". The Flash and Green Lantern took them down in Justice Society of America (vol. 2) #1.

Ninth Circle
The Ninth Circle is an international group of corrupt business executives, originally founded by Robert Queen and Dante. The group's leaders have their meetings wearing masks to prevent any of them from betraying the others should they get caught. The Ninth Circle has a private army called the Burned, who are created through a baptism in lava and turned into mindless servants. The Ninth Circle serve as prominent villains throughout Green Arrow: Rebirth.

Ninth Circle in other media
The Ninth Circle appeared in season 7 of Arrow. Its notable members include Emiko Queen, the group's leader in the present timeline until the season finale, Beatrice who became the new leader, Dante, and Virgil.

O

Oblivion Front
The Oblivion Front, whose forces were clad in blue, red, and gold armor, was "a terrorist splinter group" led by Dominion (Dominique Duchamp). Dominion herself wore a similar, less-armored costume and had a scar down the right side of her face. Dominion later led the Oblivion Front in an assault during which they intended to raid a weapons vault. Instead, the entire group was taken down by Gunfire. They first appeared in Showcase '94 #1.

O.G.R.E.
O.G.R.E. is an acronym used by two different groups in the DC Universe.

O.G.R.E. I

Created by Bob Haney and Nick Cardy, this group first appeared in Aquaman #26 (July 1976).

Within the context of the DC Universe, the first incarnation of O.G.R.E. (short for Organization for General Revenge and Enslavement) is a small mercenary terrorist group, led by the black-hooded Supreme One. Operating for an unnamed foreign government, they have confronted Aquaman in a number of occasions and worked through either hired agents, such as Black Manta, or coerced ones, such as Typhoon and the Huntress.

O.G.R.E. II
First appearing in Aquaman (vol. 4) #9 (August 1992) and within the context of the DC Universe, the second incarnation of O.G.R.E. (short for the Ocean Going Resource Exchange and also referred to as the Exchange) is a corporate extension of Merrevale Oil created by Jordan Wylie. Publicly presenting itself as an environmental firm, its actual activities bring it into conflict with Aquaman and the Sea Devils. This results in Wylie being removed from public positions at Merrevale and the Exchange.

Omega
The murders of several foreign intelligence agents led Batman on an international search for answers. In the course of the case, Batman learned of the abduction of Hungarian physicist Lucas Nagy and eventually pieced together clues that indicated that a terrorist organization known as Omega had forced him to build a 20-megaton nuclear bomb. When the terrorists threatened Gotham City with a nuclear holocaust, Batman's own experiences seemed to back up their claims. Eventually, Batman discovered that Omega's leader had manipulated everyone. Unable to force Nagy to create such a bomb, the leader realized that no one would know whether Omega truly had a bomb and set out to convince everyone that it did exist, with Batman as "Omega's prime witness". Their only appearance is in Batman #281-283.

Onslaught

Onslaught is a team of superpowered international terrorists-for-hire operating out of the outlaw nation of Qurac. The team was created and guided by Qurac's President Marlo and had accepted, as its first commission, the assignment of killing the President of the United States. Former Suicide Squad member Jess Bright, now a Soviet operative named Koshchei, helped bioengineer candidates for the team.

Order of St. Dumas
The Order of St. Dumas, originally part of the Knights Templar and also called the Sacred Order of Saint Dumas, were a group of soldier-monks that were formed during the Crusades. The Order enriched itself, though, during the Crusades, then went into hiding. The Order's first champion was an Asian man named Stephen Forrest Lee, the assassin known to Mark Shaw as Dumas. The failure of this champion splintered the order. The main branch retreated and the violent splinter elements created a new champion called Azrael, a hereditary title given to the splinter Order's near-superhuman enforcer and assassin. Members of the splinter Order enlarged the organization's power by killing their enemies, hoarding knowledge, and kidnapping some of the greatest thinkers in the world. The Order also invented "disinformation", to ensure that the theories of the kidnapped geniuses would look so silly that nobody would miss them or examine their research. With a large amount of help from the most recent Azrael, Jean-Paul Valley, the splinter group was apparently scattered.

Order of St. Dumas in other media
The Order of St. Dumas appears in the second season of Gotham. In this show, the Dumas family were one of the founders of Gotham City until Caleb Dumas had an affair with Celestine Wayne. After cutting off Caleb's hand with a knife, the Wayne family forced the Dumases into exile, where some of them took refuge with a religious extension of the family, while others remained behind and their last names were changed to Galavan. Years later, Theo Galavan and his sister Tabitha began their family's plans for revenge on the Wayne family by targeting Bruce Wayne. When The Order is near to killing Bruce Wayne as a part of their ritual, Gordon and his allies prevent it and many members are shot or arrested, Theo Galavan is killed by Gordon, while his sister Tabitha escapes with Silver St. Cloud.

The Order of St. Dumas is mentioned in Batman: Arkham City and plays a minor role in Batman: Arkham Knight where they intend to put Azrael as a successor of Batman as Gotham's protector. Batman would later discover that the Order of St. Dumas has been mind-controlling him. The outcome ranges between Batman defeating Azrael and remanding him to GCPD custody or Azrael resisting by giving up his sword in some way and leaving to get revenge on the Order of St. Dumas.

P

People's Liberation Army
The People's Liberation Army (commonly known as the "Death’s Head") first made its impact on Gotham City with a ten-week assault that included bombing banks, federal office buildings, and courthouses. Their terror campaign paralyzed the city. They were led by Thanatos, clad in a skull mask, a green costume and red cape, gloves and boots, and secretly an Italian terrorist named Sophia Santos.

The PLA later resurfaced in Washington, D.C., agreeing to "accidentally" kill an anti-crime senator during one of their attacks in exchange for a delivery of weapons and explosives from syndicate queen Irene Scarfield. The leader of this PLA operation was Bloodclaw, a bald, bearded man with crimson steel fingernails. He disappeared into the Potomac River following a fight with Batman and was presumed dead.

R

Rainbow Raiders
Since Rainbow Raider's death, a team of color-themed supervillains have dubbed themselves the Rainbow Raiders in his honor.

Each member of the Rainbow Raiders has powers based on their color:

After the death of the first Captain Boomerang, a funeral was held that every villain ever to face Flash attended. Among the large crowd was an eclectic group of metahumans calling themselves the "Rainbow Raiders", in honor of the late Flash villain. Their sentiments, expressed during the service, seemed to denote that the group was relatively new to the scene, and had little exposure, standing, or experience working together.

The Raiders were active during the Crime Syndicate of America's second invasion of Earth, encountering Johnny Quick and Power Ring (who were disguised as the Flash and Green Lantern) while attacking the Missoula County, Montana S.T.A.R. Labs facility. The battle goes badly for the two, but thanks to the help of nearby civilians, believing that their beloved heroes are in trouble, attack the Raiders and allow Power Ring and Johnny Quick to rally and subdue the group.

The fate of the Rainbow Raiders was intended for the pages of Blackest Night, and was soon after released as a "deleted page" segment in Untold Tales of the Blackest Night. Believing that, with the dead attacking, it was best to be on the 'winning side', the Raiders committed mass suicide to join the Black Lantern Corps. However they remained dead because they lacked any emotional ties sufficient to draw the attention of the black power rings, which focused on resurrecting people who would inspire certain emotions in Earth's heroes and villains, such as Lex Luthor's various murder victims, or fallen villains and heroes like Maxwell Lord and Elongated Man.

S

Scorpio

Scorpio is a mercenary group of terrorists-for-hire. Scorpio is a well-equipped organization always on the look out for advanced technology that can easily be weaponized. They were first seen in public fighting off both the Sea Devils and the Challengers of the Unknown.

S.C.Y.T.H.E.

S.C.Y.T.H.E. was an anti-government terrorist organization from a European country called Lugwainia. They abducted brilliant aeronautics engineer Robert Selkirk, who had spent years as a political prisoner in a pseudo-Soviet nation before gaining asylum in the United States, and they demanded an exchange with their imprisoned leader, Alexander Sorkhan. A United Nations team consisting of Diana Prince and Steve Trevor were assigned to go with Selkirk to the exchange, but they were waylaid by the terrorists and betrayed by Selkirk himself, who helped Sorkhan escape. Their first and only appearance was in Wonder Woman #244.

Secret Society of Super Villains

The Secret Society of Super Villains is a criminal organization that is the evil counterpart of the Justice League of America.

Shadowspire

Shadowspire supplied South American drug cartels with the necessary tools of their trade: weapons, transportation, high technology, and reliable intelligence. Shadowspire's tentacles penetrate every corrupt government and drug cartel on two continents. They even had the resources and know how to create their own weaponized viruses. Shadowspire's first appearance was in Deathstroke #53. The group was created by Tom Joyner and Mike Collins.

Silicon Syndicate
The Silicon Syndicate operates in the fictional city of Platinum Flats, which is most likely based on Silicon Valley. The Syndicate's principals were all metahumans who felt they had a free run of the city since no major superhero teams operate on the West Coast of the DC Comics universe. Known principals were Visionary, Gizmo, Kilg%re, the Matchmaker, the Calculator, the Collector, and the Joker. The group came into conflict with the Birds of Prey, who clashed with street level operatives, such as Carface, Diamond, the Gangly Man, the Mind Bullet, Topaz, and the Tuatara, before working their way up to the principals.

SKULL
The SKULL organization actively recruited discredited geniuses and outcast scientists at the behest of Albert Michaels, the first Atomic Skull. Their criminal agenda often brought them into conflict with the terrorist organization known as Kobra. They later expanded their criminal empire to the West Coast. Albert Michaels was one of the sleeper agents of rogue SKULL scientist Alysia Damalis. SKULL was introduced in 1976's Superman #301.

Skull was seemingly inactive until Simon Pons revitalized the group; Pons first appears in Outsiders #6, but does not take an active role until Outsiders Annual #1 in a story entitled "The Skull..., The Serpent... and the Outsiders". In this story, Simon Pons rebuilds SKULL and renews their long-standing feud with Kobra.

S.P.I.D.E.R.
S.P.I.D.E.R. (short for Society for Political Instability and Diverted Economic Resources) was an international crime organization based in a hidden grotto near the Riviera. The eight "legs" of the organization were devoted to Arson, Drugs, Extortion, Fraud, Gambling, Theft, Assassination, and Terrorism.

The organization was led by a green costumed albino woman named Morella. S.P.I.D.E.R.'s stated intention was to ultimately destabilize all world governments and then use the chaos to make themselves rich. Most of Morella's operatives wore standard green, yellow, and red uniforms but her division chiefs, including the Spider and the Widow, had distinctive costumes. 
S.P.I.D.E.R.'s first and only appearance was in Catwoman (vol. 2) #48-49.

Spyral
Spyral is a UN covert operations agency founded during the Cold War. Its original head, Agent Zero, decided to avoid getting involved in politics, and rather than recruiting from among the espionage services of NATO or the Warsaw Pact countries, instead recruited rebels: iconoclastic daredevils and rogue geniuses, and got them to use their mental and physical gifts to serve the agency.

At some point, it was revealed that Agent Zero was really a Nazi master spy codenamed Doctor Dedalus, and had been betraying the agency for his own ends. Soon after, the agency collapsed...or so it seemed.

In response to the escalating war between Batman Incorporated and the Leviathan terrorist organization, the UN decided to reform Spyral and recruited Doctor Dedalus' long-thought-dead daughter, Kathy Webb-Kane, as its leader. Using her personal resources, she recruited enough of a force to convince Batman, Inc. to disband as soon as the conflict was done.

In 2011, "The New 52" rebooted the DC universe. In Prime-Earth's history, Doctor Dedalus was revealed to have created both Spyral and Leviathan as part of a deranged attempt at immortality, setting up the two organizations to oppose each other in a never-ending cycle of vendetta, and grooming his children to manage the two agencies.

Spyral received more funding and new members in the wake of the "Forever Evil" incident. With the organization firmly re-established, the subsequent Directors of Spyral followed varying goals, unknowingly influenced by the agency's real leader, an entity called Spyder, who was eventually revealed to be a computerized copy of the mind of the late Doctor Dedalus.

Agent Obscura is tasked with convincing Plastic Man to infiltrate a multi-dimensional conspiracy.

Strike Force Kobra
Kobra researched every villain that ever fought Batman and how they each acquired their respective powers. After obtaining some test subjects, Kobra had his researchers use this information to transform them into Strike Force Kobra. The members consist of Clayface IV, Elemental Woman, Planet Master II, Spectrumonster, and Zebra-Man II. Kobra sent them to fight the Outsiders and infiltrate Stagg Enterprises. During the resulting fight, Spectrumonster was destroyed and the rest of Strike Force Kobra was defeated by the Outsiders and arrested by the police. During the Infinite Crisis storyline, Strike Force Kobra members Planet Master II, a somehow-revived Spectrumonster, and Zebra-Man II appear as members of Alexander Luthor Jr.'s Secret Society of Super Villains where they are seen during the Battle of Metropolis.

Kobra would later form a second incarnation of Strike Force Kobra led by his cult member Lady Eve and consisting of Dervish, Fauna Faust, Syonide IV, and Windfall. When this version of Strike Force Kobra was defeated by Eradicator's incarnation of the Outsiders even after the death of the fourth Syonide, Lady Eve called Kobra for help only for him to tell them to surrender. This action caused a strain between Kobra and Lady Eve.

The Syndicate
The extraterrestrial crime cartel known as the Syndicate was a loose alliance of alien interests operating on Earth. Known members included drug dealer Byth Rok and smuggler Kanjar Ro. The Syndicate's operations were highlighted during the Crime lord/Syndicate War a storyline which ran through the titles Darkstars #32 (March 1995), Deathstroke #48-50 (June–August 1995), and The New Titans #122 (June 1995). The Crime lord was eventually revealed to be Steve Dayton and the Syndicate was crushed by a collection of Earth's heroes including Extreme Justice, the Outsiders, and the Blood Pack.

T

Tartarus
Tartarus is a villain organization that was established by Vandal Savage in his plot to destroy the Teen Titans. Its known members include Cheshire, Gorilla Grodd, Lady Vic, Red Panzer, and Siren.

Terror Titans

The Terror Titans is a mirror group of the Teen Titans. It is led by Clock King II and consists of Dreadbolt, Copperhead II, Disruptor, and Persuader.

V

Veil
An American-based xenophobic anti-alien organization, the Veil is led by several influential industrialists and politicians, but was secretly founded by Pylon an agent of the alien H'San Natall. The Veil used mercenaries such as Dark Nemesis and Deathstroke the Terminator to attack the Teen Titans. The organization was later disbanded due to the efforts of the Teen Titans. First appears in Teen Titans (vol. 2) #3 (December 1996).

Vulture

The organization known as Vulture was a vast international crime cartel that was infiltrated, thwarted, and eventually completely destroyed by J'onn J'onzz, the Martian Manhunter. Their secretive leader had a number of aliases: Mister Vulture, Mister V, and Faceless (a.k.a. Marco Xavier). Vulture first appeared in The House of Mystery #160 (July 1966) and was created by Jack Miller and Joe Certa.

W

Wildebeest Society

The Wildebeest Society was an international organization led by a mysterious figure. The society repeatedly came into conflict with the Teen Titans. As a result of certain genetics programs within the Society, X-24 (Pantha) was created. A later program created the creature known as Baby Wildebeest. The Titans were later shocked to discover that the Wildebeest leader was former Titan Jericho. Jericho had created the Society in order to grow bodies for the tainted souls of New Azarath which were currently in possession of his body. Jericho had used the Society as a front to kidnap the Titans and use their bodies for this end. Jericho's body was destroyed by his father, Deathstroke the Terminator but his consciousness survived, hidden in his father's mind.

Recently, a new Wildebeest Society has appeared, consisting of new 'beests grown by Goth and the Contessa, using schematics and technology created by the original Society. First appears in The New Teen Titans (vol. 2) #36 (October 1987).

Wonderland Gang
The Wonderland Gang is a group of criminals that are themed after characters from Alice's Adventures in Wonderland and Through the Looking-Glass. The group was organized by Tweedledum and Tweedledee and consisted of March Harriet, the Walrus, the Carpenter, the Lion, and the Unicorn. Tweedledum and Tweedledee use Mad Hatter's mind-control technology on him so that he would be their puppet leader of the Wonderland Gang. The Wonderland Gang commit various gimmicky heists before Batman deduces the Tweeds to be the true masterminds. Once the three are returned to Arkham Asylum, the Mad Hatter quickly exacts revenge on the two, manipulating them into a bloody brawl with his mind control chips.

In "DC Rebirth", another incarnation of the Wonderland Gang appears where its members consist of Mad Hatter, Tweedledum and Tweedledee, White Rabbit, March Harriet, the Walrus, and the Carpenter.

Wonderland Gang in other media
A variation of the Wonderland Gang appears in Batwoman. This version is led by Alice, ex-Crows member Chuck Dodgson, and Jonathan "Mouse" Cartwright while its minions wear masks that resemble the March Hare and the Cheshire Cat. In the episode "Through the Looking Glass", Alice returns to her hideout to look for Mouse following the death of Augustus Cartwright and finds that her minions have been slaughtered with a threatening note to Alice from Safiyah Sohail. In season 3 episode "Mad as a Hatter", a mentally-ill teenager named Liam Crandle takes control of a few security guards at Mary Hamilton's graduation ceremony using Jervis Tetch's hat and makes them wear the same masks worn by Alice's men, forming his own incarnation of the Wonderland Gang. They are eventually dispatched by Batwoman and freed from Liam's mind-control.

See also
 List of criminal organizations in comics
 List of government agencies in DC Comics
 List of teams and organizations in DC Comics

References

External links
 Fanzing #49: Criminal Organizations of the DCU
 DCU Guide
 Cosmic Teams
 The Firestorm Index

Criminal organizations in DC Comics, List of
Criminal organizations in DC Comics
DC Comics, List of criminal organizations in
List of criminal organizations in DC Comics